Benton County Courthouse may refer to:

 Benton County Courthouse (Arkansas), Bentonville, Arkansas
 Benton County Courthouse (Indiana), Fowler, Indiana
 Benton County Courthouse (Iowa), Vinton, Iowa
 Benton County Courthouse (Mississippi), Ashland, Mississippi, a Mississippi Landmark
 Benton County Courthouse (Oregon), Corvallis, Oregon
 Benton County Courthouse (Washington), Prosser, Washington, listed on the National Register of Historic Places